The 2020 3. divisjon (referred to as Norsk Tipping-ligaen for sponsorship reasons) was scheduled to be a fourth-tier Norwegian football league season. The league was supposed to consist of 84 teams divided into 6 groups of 14 teams each and should have begun on 13 April 2020.

The league should have been played as a double round-robin tournament, where all teams would play 26 matches.

In mid-July it was decided to bar all B teams ("2" teams) from promotion. As reserve players in professional clubs, they would have had the chance to train since May 2020, whereas the amateur teams were not allowed to train all spring and summer as a precaution during the COVID-19 pandemic in Norway.

The 2020 season was cancelled on 18 September.

Team changes 
The following teams have changed division since the 2019 season.

To 3. divisjon
Promoted from 4. divisjon
 18 teams

Relegated from 2. divisjon
 Vidar
 Sola
 Byåsen
 Elverum
 Oppsal
 Mjølner

From 3. divisjon
Promoted to 2. divisjon
 Eidsvold Turn
 Vålerenga 2
 Fløy
 Vard Haugesund
 Rosenborg 2
 Fløya

Relegated to 4. divisjon
 18 teams

League tables
NOT PLAYED

Group 1

Group 2

Group 3

Group 4

Group 5

Group 6

References

Norwegian Third Division seasons
3
Norway
Norway
divisjon